The Second Battle of Cabin Creek  was part of a plan conceived by Confederate Brigadier General Stand Watie (who had been promoted from colonel after the First Battle of Cabin Creek). The plan was to have a Confederate force attack central Kansas from Indian Territory, raiding Union Army facilities and encouraging Indian tribes in Western Kansas to join in an attack on the eastern part of the state. Watie presented the plan to his superior, General S. B. Maxey on February 5, 1864. Maxey approved the plan on the condition that the attack would start by October 1, to coincide with an attack on Missouri already planned by General Sterling Price.

Preparation 
Brigadier General Richard Montgomery Gano and Watie met at Camp Pike in the Choctaw Nation on 13 September 1864, to make plans for the coming expedition. Gano, commanding several Texas Confederate units, had agreed to join Watie as co-leader of the campaign. Watie, however, knew that most of the Texans hated all the Indians, including their allies, and resented his promotion in the Confederate Army. According to one account, "...Colonel Charles DeMorse of the 29th Texas Cavalry Regiment refused to serve under him."  Watie, therefore, deferred to Gano as commander of the expedition. Both Gano and Maxey commended Waite for this act of solidarity. Moreover, Gano had more seniority as a Confederate general than did Watie. Watie would continue to command the Indian Brigade, composed of about 800 men. Gano's brigade comprised Texas cavalry and artillery units containing about 1,200 men.

The raid had targeted a wagon train that left Fort Scott on 12 September. It carried supplies and provisions intended for Native Americans who had fled their homes and camped near Fort Gibson. It was led by Major Henry Hopkins. The train was escorted by 80 soldiers of the Second Kansas Cavalry, 50 men from the 6th Kansas Cavalry and 130 men of the Fourteenth Kansas Cavalry. A group of 100 pro-Union Cherokees joined the train at Baxter Springs, Kansas, but half were left at the Neosho River junction to guard the rear. The escort was to be increased by 170 Union Cherokees of the Second Indian Regiment, based at Cabin Creek, and 140 Cherokees of the Third Indian Regiment en route from Fort Gibson

Major Hopkins received a message to move the train to Cabin Creek as fast as possible and await further orders. The message also said that Major John A. Foreman, six companies of men and two howitzers were en route as a relief force. The train arrived at Cabin Creek station during the afternoon of September 18.

Flat Rock attack 
Captain E. A. Barker leading a small group of the 2nd Kansas Cavalry and a detachment from the 1st Kansas Colored Infantry, who were guarding the operation, were soon surrounded and attacked from all sides. In desperation, Barker ordered his men with horses to attempt a breakout. Only 15 of the 65 men who attempted to break out reached the fort. The Union troops lost all their hay-making equipment, several hundred tons of hay and over 100 casualties (including prisoners). There were unconfirmed reports that many of the black troops were killed by the Texans. These killings led to one historian's calling the action one of Watie's three most infamous actions of the war.

Confederate attack 
The assault began at 1:00 A.M. on September 19. The Confederates advanced with the Texans covering the left flank and the Indian Brigade on the right flank. After the Union troops began to fire, the Confederate artillery answered. The barrage caused the mules to panic and run. Many dragged their wagons with them. Some were so terrified that they fell off the bluff and into Cabin Creek. The teamsters managed cut many of the mules from their traces. Men jumped on the mules and rode across the ford to safer ground.

Sunrise revealed the Union positions. Gano moved part of his artillery to his right flank, so that the wagon train would be caught in crossfire. The two Cherokee regiments moved across the creek to capture the wagons that had escaped in the darkness. The Texans, led by Gano himself, attacked the Union flank, driving it back until the defenders were scattered in the wooded bottoms along the creek. By 9:00 A.M., the Union forces had been routed. Major Hopkins escaped to Fort Gibson, hoping to meet the Major Foreman's relief force and recapture the train. Failing to find the relief force, he continued to Fort Gibson bearing the news of the disaster.

Outcome 
The Confederate force, led by Watie and Gano captured a Federal wagon train about $1 million worth of wagons, mules, commissary supplies, and other needed items. Specifically, the booty included 740 mules and 130 wagons. Although Watie and his troops were commended for their success by Confederate President Jefferson Davis and the Confederate Congress, this battle had no significant impact on the outcome of the Civil War in Indian Territory.

See also

 List of battles fought in Oklahoma

Notes

References

External links
 Encyclopedia of Oklahoma History and Culture – Cabin Creek, Battle of

Cabin Creek
Cabin Creek
Mayes County, Oklahoma
Cabin Creek
Cabin Creek
Protected areas of Mayes County, Oklahoma
September 1864 events